KOFY (1060 kHz) was a daytime-only AM medium wave radio station in Gilmer, Texas, United States. It first aired in 1973, and formerly used the call signs KBNB, KHYM, and KTLG until becoming KOFY in 1999. It was deleted in 2012.

References

External links
 

OFY
Defunct radio stations in the United States
Radio stations established in 1973
1973 establishments in Texas
Radio stations disestablished in 2012
2012 disestablishments in Texas
OFY (AM)
OFY (AM)
OFY